In enzymology, a gibberellin 3beta-dioxygenase is an enzyme that catalyzes the chemical reaction

gibberellin 20 + 2-oxoglutarate + O2  gibberellin 1 + succinate + CO2

The 3 substrates of this enzyme are gibberellin 20, 2-oxoglutarate, and O2, whereas its 3 products are gibberellin 1, succinate, and CO2.

This enzyme belongs to the family of oxidoreductases, specifically those acting on paired donors, with O2 as the oxidant. The oxygen incorporated need not be derived from O2 with 2-oxoglutarate as one donor, and one atom of oxygen is incorporated into each donor. The systematic name of this enzyme class is (gibberellin-20), 2-oxoglutarate: oxygen oxidoreductase (3beta-hydroxylating). Other names in common use include gibberellin 3beta-hydroxylase, (gibberrellin-20), 2-oxoglutarate: oxygen oxidoreductase and (3beta-hydroxylating). This enzyme participates in diterpenoid biosynthesis. It has 2 cofactors: iron and Ascorbate.

References

 

EC 1.14.11
Iron enzymes
Ascorbate enzymes
Enzymes of unknown structure